Phellibaumins are hispidin derivatives made by the fungus Phellinus.

References

External links 
Phenolic compounds with NF-κB inhibitory effects from the fungus Phellinus baumii

Hispidins
Phellinus